New Freedom may refer to:

New Freedom, Pennsylvania, a borough in York County, Pennsylvania, United States
New Freedom, New Jersey, an unincorporated community in Camden County, New Jersey, United States
The New Freedom, Woodrow Wilson's domestic policy while President of the United States 
New Freedom (SAFETEA-LU), a program with the USA's current transportation planning and funding legislation, SAFETEA-LU
New Freedom, a former brand of feminine hygiene by Kotex

See also
New Freedom Commission on Mental Health
New Freedom Railroad Station, Northern Central Railway